is a former Japanese football player. She played for Japan national team.

Club career
Yonetsu was born in Osaka Prefecture on December 4, 1979. After graduating from Himeji Gakuin Women's Junior College, she joined her local club Toyotsu Ladies FC in 2000. In 2004, she moved to L.League club INAC Leonessa (later INAC Kobe Leonessa). She retired end of 2011 season.

National team career
On July 29, 2009, when Yonetsu was 29 years old, she debuted for Japan national team against Germany. She played 2 games for Japan in 2009.

National team statistics

References

External links

INAC Kobe Leonessa

1979 births
Living people
Association football people from Osaka Prefecture
Japanese women's footballers
Japan women's international footballers
Nadeshiko League players
INAC Kobe Leonessa players
Women's association football forwards